Ludwig Bergsträsser (23 February 1883, Altkirch, Alsace-Lorraine – 23 March 1960, Darmstadt) was a German politician, representative of the Social Democratic Party.

See also
List of Social Democratic Party of Germany politicians

References

1883 births
1960 deaths
People from Altkirch
People from Alsace-Lorraine
German Protestants
German Democratic Party politicians
Members of the Reichstag of the Weimar Republic
Members of the Bundestag for Hesse
Commanders Crosses of the Order of Merit of the Federal Republic of Germany
Ministers-President of Hesse
Members of the Bundestag 1949–1953
Members of the Bundestag for the Social Democratic Party of Germany
Members of Parlamentarischer Rat